Edina Gallovits-Hall and Polona Hercog were the defending champions. However, they chose not to compete this year.
In the final, 4th seeded Irina-Camelia Begu and Elena Bogdan defeated the unseeded Ekaterina Ivanova and Kathrin Wörle.

Seeds

Draw

Finals

References
 Main Draw

Copa Bionaire - Doubles
Copa Bionaire